Brugmansia longifolia is a name given by G. Lagerheim to a plant collected in Ecuador in 1895 with long narrow leaves and undulated indentations.  It is now considered to be a superfluous synonym of Brugmansia insignis.

References

Flora of Ecuador
longifolia
Taxonomy articles created by Polbot